Kostar (romanized: Kostári) is a village in Vlorë County, southern Albania. At the 2015 local government reform it became part of the municipality of Delvinë. it is inhabited by Greeks.

Demographics 
According to Ottoman statistics, the village had 86 inhabitants in 1895. The village had 328 inhabitants in 1993, all ethnically Greeks.

References 

Villages in Vlorë County
Greek communities in Albania